Mohammad Hossein Naeiji, is an Iranian goalkeeper who currently plays for Fajr Sepasi Shiraz F.C. in the Azadegan League. He previously played for Persepolis and Esteghlal F.C. in the Iran Pro League.

Club career
He moved to Persepolis in summer 2009 from Esteghlal.

Honours
Hazfi Cup
Winner: 1
2009/10 with Persepolis

References

1990 births
Living people
Iranian footballers
Association football goalkeepers
PAS Hamedan F.C. players
Persepolis F.C. players
Gostaresh Foulad F.C. players